Ain't Nobody a Stranger to Me is a 2007 picture book by Ann Grifalconi and illustrator Jerry Pinkney about an old man telling his granddaughter of he and his young family's journey to freedom with assistance from the Underground Railroad.

Reception
School Library Journal (SLJ), in a review of Ain't Nobody a Stranger to Me, wrote "While this is not the author's or illustrator's strongest effort, educators in schools and churches will find uses for the Good Samaritan lessons presented throughout." Publishers Weekly called it a "resonant, moving story" and concluded "An inspired collaboration."

Ain't Nobody a Stranger to Me has also been reviewed by The Horn Book Magazine, Booklist, Kirkus Reviews, Black Issues Book Review, and ''The Reading Teacher.

Awards
2007 The Society of School Librarians International Language Arts - Picture Books Award - honor
2008 Horace Mann Upstanders Award - honor
2010 AGHE Book Award for Best Children’s Literature on Aging: Elementary Reader - winner

References

2007 children's books
American picture books
Picture books by Jerry Pinkney
Books about African-American history